The Interior is a football club from Serrekunda in the West African, state of Gambia, located near the capital of Banjul. They play in the GFA League Second Division, which is the highest league in Gambian football.

Stadium
Currently the team plays at the 2,000 capacity Box Bar Mini Stadium.

References

External links
Soccerway

Football clubs in the Gambia